The 2014 Kakkonen season started on 18 April and ended on 4 October 2014.

Teams
A total of 40 teams contested the league divided into four groups, Eteläinen (Southern), Pohjoinen (Northern), Läntinen (Western) and Itäinen (Eastern). 29 returning from the 2013 season, two relegated from Ykkönen and nine promoted from Kolmonen. The champion of each group qualified to promotion matches to decide which two teams get promoted to the Ykkönen. The bottom two teams in each group and the worst eight-placed qualified directly for relegation to Kolmonen. Each team played a total of 27 matches, three times against each team of its group.

AC Kajaani and OPS were relegated from the 2013 Ykkönen, while FC Jazz and HIFK were promoted to the 2014 Ykkönen.

EsPa, FC POHU, Härmä, LPS, MuSa, ORPa, Sudet and Tervarit were relegated from 2013 Kakkonen.

FC Espoo, FC Myllypuro, FC Viikkarit, I-Kissat, JBK, OLS, SC KuFu-98 and SOVO were promoted from the 2013 Kolmonen.

SavU (winner of Kolmonen Kaakkois-Suomi) didn't take its place in 2014 Kakkonen. Its place was given for JäPS, the worst eight-placed of the last season.

KTP merged with FC KooTeePee. Its place was given for Kultsu FC, the runner-up of Kolmonen Kaakkois-Suomi.

Stadia and locations

League tables

Eteläinen (Southern)

Pohjoinen (Northern)

Läntinen (Western)

Itäinen (Eastern)

Promotion play-offs
Group winners will play two-legged ties. Team pairs will be drawn and the two winning teams will be promoted to the Ykkönen for season 2015.

Group winners

First leg

Second leg

EIF won 6–4 on aggregate.

PS Kemi won 4–0 on aggregate.

Eight-placed teams
At the end of the season, a comparison is made between the eight-placed teams. The worst eight-placed team will be directly relegated to the Kolmonen.

See also
 2014 Veikkausliiga
 2014 Ykkönen

References

Kakkonen seasons
3
Fin
Fin